Bowmanville Creek is a stream in the municipality of Clarington, Regional Municipality of Durham in south-central Ontario, Canada. It flows from the Oak Ridges Moraine to Lake Ontario at Bowmanville. The creek is under the auspices of the Central Lake Ontario Conservation Authority.

Drainage basin
The headwaters of Bowmanville Creek border the headwaters of Oshawa Creek (to the west) and those of its left tributary Soper Creek (to the east), the headwaters of all of which are in the Oak Ridges Moraine. Between the mouths at Lake Ontario of Oshawa Creek (to the west) and Bowmanville Creek there are five smaller creeks (from west to east): Farewell Creek, Robinson Creek, Tooley Creek, Darlington Creek and Westside Creek. The next named watercourse to the east is Wilmot Creek.

Course
It flows southeast then turns south near the settlement of Enniskillen, flows under Ontario Highway 407 and reaches the settlement of Hampton.

Natural history
Bowmanville Creek has been dammed in several places. About one kilometre north of Lake Ontario is the former Goodyear dam, originally built to provide electricity for a factory. This dam was a barrier to fish migration, and until the construction of a fish ladder trout and salmon were lifted over the dam by volunteers and conservation workers. A little further north, in what is now downtown Bowmanville, a dam provided water power for the Vanstone Mill until it was washed out in a storm in 1986.

References

Rivers of the Regional Municipality of Durham